Brian John Marples FRSNZ (31 March 1907 – 1997) was a British zoologist who spent most of his career in New Zealand.

Early years
Marples was born in Hessle, Yorkshire, in north-eastern England. He was educated at Kingsmead in Cheshire, and St Bees in Cumberland before attending Exeter College at Oxford University. He graduated as a BA from Oxford in 1929, subsequently obtaining a MSc from the University of Manchester in 1931, and MA from Oxford in 1933. He married Mary (Molly) Joyce Ransford in 1931.

Career
From 1930 to 1936 Marples worked as Assistant Lecturer in Zoology at Manchester. In 1937 he went to New Zealand to become Professor of Zoology at the University of Otago, a position he served in for 30 years before retiring in 1967 to Woodstock, near Oxford in southern England. He published numerous papers on a wide variety of zoological topics, especially in the fields of ornithology, arachnology and fossil penguins. He was also a cofounder of the Ornithological Society of New Zealand.

Honours
 1953 – Fellow, Royal Society of New Zealand
 1980 – Honorary Member, Ornithological Society of New Zealand

References

1907 births
1997 deaths
20th-century British zoologists
New Zealand ornithologists
New Zealand paleontologists
Alumni of Exeter College, Oxford
Academics of the University of Manchester Institute of Science and Technology
Academic staff of the University of Otago
British arachnologists
People from Hessle
Scientists from Dunedin
20th-century New Zealand zoologists